FantasySCOTUS is an online fantasy league created by Josh Blackman. FantasySCOTUS was subsequently acquired by LexPredict, LLC.

Those participating in the league predict how each member of the United States Supreme Court will rule on any given case. As of 2014, more than 25,000 had signed up. A high school version was launched in 2015 with the goal of raising awareness of constitutional law.

References 

 

Fantasy sports
Supreme Court of the United States